An icefall is a portion of certain glaciers characterized by relatively rapid flow and chaotic crevassed surface, caused in part by gravity. The term icefall is formed by analogy with the word waterfall, which is a similar phenomenon of the liquid phase but at a more spectacular speed. When ice movement of a glacier is faster than elsewhere, because the glacier bed steepens or narrows, and the flow cannot be accommodated by plastic deformation, the ice fractures, forming crevasses. Where two fractures meet, seracs (or ice towers) can be formed. When the movement of the ice slows down, the crevasses can coalesce, resulting in the surface of the glacier becoming smoother.

Ice flow
Perhaps the most conspicuous consequence of glacier flow, icefalls occur where the glacier bed steepens and/or narrows. Most glacier ice flows at speeds of a few hundred metres per year or less. However, the flow of ice in an icefall may be measured in kilometres per year. Such rapid flow cannot be accommodated by plastic deformation of the ice. Instead, the ice fractures, forming crevasses. Intersecting fractures form ice columns or seracs. These processes are imperceptible for the most part; however, a serac may collapse or topple abruptly and without warning. This behavior often poses the biggest risk to mountaineers climbing in an icefall.

Below the icefall, the glacier bed flattens and/or widens and the ice flow slows. Crevasses close and the glacier surface becomes much smoother and easier to traverse.

Examples
Icefalls vary greatly in height. Typical of mountain glaciers, this icefall forms as the ice flows from a high elevation plateau or basin accumulation zone to a lower valley ablation zone. Much larger icefalls may be found in the outlet glaciers of continental ice sheets.

Icefalls are climbed because of their beauty and the challenge they pose. In some cases, an icefall may provide the only feasible or the easiest route up one face of a mountain. An example is the Khumbu Icefall on the Nepalese side of Mount Everest, variously described as "treacherous" and "dangerous."

See also
Glacier morphology

References

External links

Ice climbing
Bodies of ice
 
Hazards of outdoor recreation